Sir Banu (also Romanized as Sīr Bānū; also known as Qal‘eh-ye Sīr Bānū) is a village in Ahmadabad Rural District, Hasanabad District, Eqlid County, Fars Province, Iran. At the 2006 census, its population was 98, in 23 families.

References 

Populated places in Eqlid County